In baseball statistics, batting average against (denoted by BAA or AVG), also known as opponents' batting average (denoted by OBA), is a statistic that measures a pitcher's ability to prevent hits during official at bats. It can alternatively be described as the league's hitters' combined batting average against the pitcher.

Definition
Batting average against is calculated as:

for which:
H is the number of hits allowed by the pitcher
BF is the number of batters faced
BB is the number of base on balls
HBP is the number of hit batsmen
SH is the number of sacrifice hits
SF is the number of sacrifice flies
CINT is the number of catcher's interference

For example, if a pitcher faced 125 batters and allowed 25 hits, issued 8 walks, hit 1 batsman, allowed 2 sacrifice hits, allowed 3 sacrifice flies, and had 1 instance of catcher's interference, the pitcher's BAA would be calculated as:

Reference site Baseball-Reference.com more simply defines BAA as hits divided by at bats, as "at bats" for a pitcher equates to the above noted denominator (batters faced less walks, hit by pitch, sacrifice hits, sacrifice flies, and catcher's interference):

For example, in 2021, Max Scherzer had the best (lowest) batting average against in Major League Baseball among qualified pitchers. Scherzer's BAA for the 2021 season was:

See also
Hits per nine innings (H/9)
Walks plus hits per inning pitched (WHIP)

Notes

References

External links
 OBA Calculator at captaincalculator.com

Pitching statistics